The China Securities Regulatory Commission (CSRC) is a government ministry of the State Council of the People's Republic of China (PRC). It is the main regulator of the securities industry in China.

History
China's first Securities Law was passed December 1998, and became effective July 1, 1999. It is the nation's first comprehensive securities legislation, and grants CSRC "authority to implement a centralized and unified regulation of the nationwide securities market in order to ensure their lawful operation". The CSRC oversees China's nationwide centralized securities supervisory system, with the power to regulate and supervise securities issuers, as well as to investigate, and impose penalties for "illegal activities related to securities and futures". The CSRC is empowered to issue opinions or "Guideline Opinions", which are not legally binding, as guidelines for publicly-traded corporations.

Indicative of the role of the CSRC, China's highest court, the Supreme People's Court–at least as of 2004–has declined to handle securities-related litigation directly, instead deferring such judgments to the CSRC.

In November 2022, it stated its role to build "a capital market with Chinese characteristics."

See also
 Economy of China
 Untraded shares
Beijing Stock Exchange
 Shanghai Stock Exchange
 Shenzhen Stock Exchange
 Law of the People's Republic of China
 China Banking Regulatory Commission
 China Insurance Regulatory Commission
 Hedge fund industry in China
 China Venture Capital Association
 China Securities Journal

References

External links
 

1992 establishments in China
Financial regulatory authorities of China
Government agencies established in 1992
Government agencies of China
Organizations based in Beijing
Securities and exchange commissions
State Council of the People's Republic of China